Franco Battaini (born 22 July 1972 in Brescia) is an Italian motorcycle road racer. His best years were in 2002 and 2003 when he finished sixth in the 250cc world championship. In 2005 Battaini competed in MotoGP aboard the Blata WCM. He had a very unsuccessful season taking a best finish of 11th in Japan – where many riders retired from the race. In 2006 Battaini competed in the Superbike World Championship.

Career statistics

Grand Prix motorcycle racing

Races by year
(key) (Races in bold indicate pole position, races in italics indicate fastest lap)

Superbike World Championship

Races by year
(key) (Races in bold indicate pole position, races in italics indicate fastest lap)

Supersport World Championship
(key) (Races in bold indicate pole position, races in italics indicate fastest lap)

Races by year

References

External links 

Profile on WorldSBK.com

1972 births
Living people
Sportspeople from Brescia
Italian motorcycle racers
250cc World Championship riders
MotoGP World Championship riders
Superbike World Championship riders
Supersport World Championship riders